This article lists subnational environmental agencies in the United States, by state. Agencies with a variety of titles and responsibilities are included, e.g. Department of Environment, Department of Environmental Conservation, Department of Environmental Management, Department of Environmental Protection, Department of Natural Resources, etc. Agencies created as a result of interstate environmental compacts also are included, at the bottom of the list.

Alabama 
 Alabama Department of Conservation and Natural Resources
 Alabama Department of Environmental Management

Alaska 
 Alaska Department of Natural Resources
 Alaska Department of Environmental Conservation

Arizona 
 Arizona Department of Environmental Quality
 Arizona Game and Fish Department

Arkansas 
 Arkansas Department of Environmental Quality

California 

 California Environmental Protection Agency
 California Department of Pesticide Regulation
 California Department of Toxic Substances Control
 California Air Resources Board
 California Department of Resources Recycling and Recovery
 California Natural Resources Agency
 California Department of Conservation
 California Department of Fish and Game
 California Department of Forestry and Fire Protection
 California Department of Parks and Recreation
 California Department of Water Resources

Colorado 
 Colorado Department of Natural Resources

Connecticut 
 Connecticut Department of Energy and Environmental Protection

Delaware 
 Delaware Department of Natural Resources and Environmental Control

District of Columbia 
 Department of Energy and Environment

Florida 
 Florida Department of Environmental Protection
 Florida Fish and Wildlife Conservation Commission
 Northwest Florida Water Management District
 Suwannee River Water Management District
 St. Johns River Water Management District
 Southwest Florida Water Management District
 South Florida Water Management District

Georgia 
 Georgia Department of Natural Resources

Hawaii 
 Hawai'i Department of Land and Natural Resources

Idaho 
 Idaho Department of Environmental Quality

Illinois 
 Illinois Department of Natural Resources
 Illinois Environmental Protection Agency

Indiana 
 Indiana Department of Environmental Management
 Indiana Department of Natural Resources

Iowa 
 Iowa Department of Natural Resources

Kansas 
 Kansas Department of Agriculture, Division of Water Resources
 Kansas Department of Health and Environment, Division of Environment

Kentucky 
 Kentucky Department for Natural Resources
 Kentucky Department of Environmental Protection

Louisiana 
 Louisiana Department of Environmental Quality
 Louisiana Department of Natural Resources

Maine 
 Maine Department of Environmental Protection
 Maine Department of Agriculture, Conservation and Forestry
 Maine Department of Inland Fisheries and Wildlife

Maryland 
 Maryland Department of Natural Resources
 Maryland Department of the Environment

Massachusetts 
 Massachusetts Executive Office of Energy and Environmental Affairs (EOEEA)
 Coastal Zone Management
 Water Resources Commission
 Massachusetts Environmental Police
 Office of Grants and Technical Assistance
 Division of Conservation Services
 Massachusetts Environmental Trust
 Office of Technical Assistance and Technology
 Natural Resource Damages Assessment and Restoration
 Massachusetts Department of Agricultural Resources
 Division of Agricultural Conservation and Tech Assistance
 Division of Agricultural Markets
 Division of Animal Health
 Division of Crop and Pest Services
 Massachusetts Department of Conservation and Recreation
 Division of State Parks (MassParks)
 Division of Water Supply Protection
 Massachusetts Department of Energy Resources
 Massachusetts Department of Environmental Protection
 Massachusetts Department of Fish and Game
 Division of Fisheries and Wildlife (MassWildlife)
 Division of Marine Fisheries
 Division of Ecological Restoration
 Office of Fishing and Boating Access

Michigan 
 Michigan Department of Environmental Quality
 Michigan Department of Natural Resources

Minnesota 
 Minnesota Department of Health
 Minnesota Department of Natural Resources
 Minnesota Environmental Quality Board
 Minnesota Pollution Control Agency
 University of Minnesota Extension Service

Mississippi 
 Mississippi Department of Environmental Quality

Missouri 
 Missouri Department of Conservation
 Missouri Department of Natural Resources

Montana 
 Montana Department of Natural Resources and Conservation

Nebraska 
 Nebraska Department of Natural Resources

Nevada 
 Nevada Department of Conservation and Natural Resources

New Hampshire 
 New Hampshire Department of Environmental Services

New Jersey 
 New Jersey Department of Environmental Protection
 New Jersey Division of Parks and Forestry

New Mexico 
 New Mexico Department of Energy, Minerals, and Natural Resources
 New Mexico Environment Department

New York 
 Adirondack Park Agency
 Hudson River Valley Greenway
 New York City Department of Environmental Protection
 New York State Department of Agriculture and Markets
 New York State Department of Environmental Conservation
 New York State Energy Research and Development Authority
 New York State Environmental Facilities Corporation
 New York State Office of Parks, Recreation and Historic Preservation

North Carolina 
 North Carolina Department of Environment and Natural Resources

North Dakota 
 North Dakota Department of Environmental Quality

Ohio 
 Ohio Department of Natural Resources
 Ohio Environmental Protection Agency

Oklahoma 
 Oklahoma Department of Environmental Quality

Oregon 
 Oregon Department of Environmental Quality
 Oregon Department of Forestry
 Oregon Department of Fish and Wildlife
 Oregon Department of Water Resources
 Oregon Watershed Enhancement Board

Pennsylvania 
 Pennsylvania Department of Conservation and Natural Resources
 Pennsylvania Department of Environmental Protection

Rhode Island 
 Rhode Island Department of Environmental Management

South Carolina 
 South Carolina Department of Health and Environmental Control
 South Carolina Department of Natural Resources

South Dakota 
 South Dakota Department of Environment and Natural Resources

Tennessee 
 Tennessee Department of Environment and Conservation
 Tennessee Wildlife Resources Agency

Texas 
 Texas Commission on Environmental Quality
 Texas Parks and Wildlife Department

Utah 
 Utah Department of Environmental Quality
 Utah Department of Natural Resources

Vermont 
 Vermont Agency of Natural Resources
 Vermont Department of Environmental Conservation
 Vermont Department of Fish and Wildlife
 Vermont Department of Forests, Parks and Recreation

Virginia 
 Virginia Department of Environmental Quality
 Virginia Department of Agriculture and Consumer Services
 Virginia Department of Conservation and Recreation
 Virginia Department of Forestry
 Virginia Department of Wildlife Resources

Washington (state) 
 Washington State Department of Ecology
 Washington State Department of Natural Resources

West Virginia 
 West Virginia Department of Environmental Protection
 West Virginia Division of Forestry
 West Virginia Division of Natural Resources

Wisconsin 
 Wisconsin Department of Natural Resources

Wyoming 
 Wyoming Department of Environmental Quality

Interstate agencies 
 Atlantic States Marine Fisheries Commission
 Great Lakes Commission
 Interstate Commission on the Potomac River Basin
 Northwest Power and Conservation Council
 Red River Compact Commission
 Susquehanna River Basin Commission
 Tahoe Regional Planning Agency
 Yellowstone River Compact Commission

See also 

US Federal environmental agencies
 Council on Environmental Quality
 Department of Agriculture, including the USFS
 Department of Defense
 Department of Energy
 Department of the Interior, including the BLM, Fish and Wildlife Service, National Park Service, USGS
 US Environmental Protection Agency
 National Oceanic and Atmospheric Administration
 National Drought Policy Commission (defunct)

US Territories
 Puerto Rico Department of Natural and Environmental Resources

Other 
 List of environmental ministries

References

External links 
 U.S. Environmental Protection Agency, "Health and Environmental Agencies of U.S. States and Territories" (website)

 01
Agencies
States of the United States-related lists
.
.
USA
Environmental